Juno is a NASA space probe orbiting the planet Jupiter. It was built by Lockheed Martin and is operated by NASA Jet Propulsion Laboratory. The spacecraft was launched from Cape Canaveral Air Force Station on August 5, 2011 UTC, as part of the New Frontiers program. Juno entered a polar orbit of Jupiter on July 5, 2016, UTC, to begin a scientific investigation of the planet. After completing its mission, Juno will be intentionally deorbited into Jupiter's atmosphere.

Juno mission is to measure Jupiter's composition, gravitational field, magnetic field, and polar magnetosphere.

Juno is the second spacecraft to orbit Jupiter, after the nuclear powered Galileo orbiter, which orbited from 1995 to 2003. Unlike all earlier spacecraft sent to the outer planets, Juno is powered by solar panels, commonly used by satellites orbiting Earth and working in the inner Solar System, whereas radioisotope thermoelectric generators are commonly used for missions to the outer Solar System and beyond. For Juno, however, the three largest solar panel wings ever deployed on a planetary probe play an integral role in stabilizing the spacecraft as well as generating power.

Naming 

A NASA compilation of mission names and acronyms referred to the mission by the backronym Jupiter Near-polar Orbiter. However the project itself has consistently described it as a name with mythological associations and not an acronym. The spacecraft's current name is in reference to the Roman goddess Juno. Juno is sometimes called the New Frontiers 2 as the second mission in the New Frontiers program, but is not to be confused with New Horizons 2, a proposed but unselected New Frontiers mission.

Overview 

Juno was selected on June 9, 2005, as the next New Frontiers mission after New Horizons. The desire for a Jupiter probe was strong in the years prior to this, but there had not been any approved missions. The Discovery Program had passed over the somewhat similar but more limited Interior Structure and Internal Dynamical Evolution of Jupiter (INSIDE Jupiter) proposal, and the turn-of-the-century era Europa Orbiter was canceled in 2002. The flagship-level Europa Jupiter System Mission was in the works in the early 2000s, but funding issues resulted in it evolving into ESA's Jupiter Icy Moons Explorer.

Juno completed a five-year cruise to Jupiter, arriving on July 5, 2016. The spacecraft was designed to orbit Jupiter 37 times over the course of its mission. This was originally planned to take 20 months.

Juno trajectory used a gravity assist speed boost from Earth, accomplished by an Earth flyby in October 2013, two years after its launch on August 5, 2011. The spacecraft performed an orbit insertion burn to slow it enough to allow capture. It was expected to make three 53-day orbits before performing another burn on December 11, 2016, that would bring it into a 14-day polar orbit called the Science Orbit. Because of a suspected problem in Juno main engine, the burn scheduled on December 11, 2016, was cancelled and Juno remained in its 53-day orbit until the first Ganymede encounter of its Extended Mission. This extended mission began with a flyby of Ganymede on June 7, 2021.  Subsequent flybys of Europa and then Io will further decrease the orbital period to 33 days by February 2024.

During the science mission, infrared and microwave instruments will measure the thermal radiation emanating from deep within Jupiter's atmosphere. These observations will complement previous studies of its composition by assessing the abundance and distribution of water, and therefore oxygen. This data will provide insight into Jupiter's origins. Juno will also investigate the convection that drives natural circulation patterns in Jupiter's atmosphere. Other instruments aboard Juno will gather data about its gravitational field and polar magnetosphere. The Juno mission was planned to conclude in February 2018 after completing 37 orbits of Jupiter, but now has been commissioned through 2025 to do a further 42 additional orbits of Jupiter as well as close flybys of Ganymede, Europa and Io. The probe was then intended to be deorbited and burnt up in Jupiter's outer atmosphere to avoid any possibility of impact and biological contamination of one of its moons.

Flight trajectory

Launch 
Juno was launched atop the Atlas V at Cape Canaveral Air Force Station (CCAFS), Florida on August 5, 2011, 16:25:00 UTC. The Atlas V (AV-029) used a Russian-built RD-180 main engine, powered by kerosene and liquid oxygen. At ignition it underwent checkout 3.8 seconds prior to the ignition of five strap-on solid rocket boosters (SRBs). Following the SRB burnout, about 93 seconds into the flight, two of the spent boosters fell away from the vehicle, followed 1.5 seconds later by the remaining three. When heating levels had dropped below predetermined limits, the payload fairing that protected Juno during launch and transit through the thickest part of the atmosphere separated, about 3 minutes 24 seconds into the flight. The Atlas V main engine cut off 4 minutes 26 seconds after liftoff. Sixteen seconds later, the Centaur second stage ignited, and it burned for about 6 minutes, putting the satellite into an initial parking orbit. The vehicle coasted for about 30 minutes, and then the Centaur was reignited for a second firing of 9 minutes, placing the spacecraft on an Earth escape trajectory in a heliocentric orbit.

Prior to separation, the Centaur stage used onboard reaction engines to spin Juno up to 1.4 r.p.m. About 54 minutes after launch, the spacecraft separated from the Centaur and began to extend its solar panels. Following the full deployment and locking of the solar panels, Juno batteries began to recharge. Deployment of the solar panels reduced Juno spin rate by two-thirds. The probe is spun to ensure stability during the voyage and so that all instruments on the probe are able to observe Jupiter.

The voyage to Jupiter took five years, and included two orbital maneuvers in August and September 2012 and a flyby of the Earth on October 9, 2013.

Flyby of the Earth 

After traveling for about a year in an elliptical heliocentric orbit, Juno fired its engine twice in 2012 near aphelion (beyond the orbit of Mars) to change its orbit and return to pass by the Earth at a distance of 559 kilometers in October 2013. It used Earth's gravity to help slingshot itself toward the Jovian system in a maneuver called a gravity assist. The flyby was also used as a rehearsal for the Juno science team to test some instruments and practice certain procedures before the arrival at Jupiter.

Insertion into Jovian orbit 
The spacecraft successfully entered Jovian orbit on July 5, 2016, at 03:53 UTC.

Orbit and environment

An eccentricity-reducing burn, called the Period Reduction Maneuver, was planned that would drop the probe into a much shorter 14 day science orbit. Originally, Juno was expected to complete 37 orbits over 20 months before the end of its mission. Due to problems with helium valves that are important during main engine burns, mission managers announced on February 17, 2017, that Juno would remain in its original 53-day orbit, since the chance of an engine misfire putting the spacecraft into a bad orbit was too high. Juno completed only 12 science orbits before the end of its budgeted mission plan, ending July 2018. In June 2018, NASA extended the mission through July 2021, as described below.

The orbits were carefully planned in order to minimize contact with Jupiter's dense radiation belts, which can damage spacecraft electronics and solar panels, by exploiting a gap in the radiation envelope near the planet, passing through a region of minimal radiation. The "Juno Radiation Vault", with 1-centimeter-thick titanium walls, also aids in protecting Juno electronics. Despite the intense radiation, JunoCam and the Jovian Infrared Auroral Mapper (JIRAM) are expected to endure at least eight orbits, while the Microwave Radiometer (MWR) should endure at least eleven orbits. Juno will receive much lower levels of radiation in its polar orbit than the Galileo orbiter received in its equatorial orbit. Galileo subsystems were damaged by radiation during its mission, including an LED in its data recording system.

Orbital operations 

The spacecraft completed its first flyby of Jupiter (perijove 1) on August 26, 2016, and captured the first images of the planet's north pole.

On October 14, 2016, days prior to perijove 2 and the planned Period Reduction Maneuver, telemetry showed that some of Juno helium valves were not opening properly. On October 18, 2016, some 13 hours before its second close approach to Jupiter, Juno entered into safe mode, an operational mode engaged when its onboard computer encounters unexpected conditions. The spacecraft powered down all non-critical systems and reoriented itself to face the Sun to gather the most power. Due to this, no science operations were conducted during perijove 2.

On December 11, 2016, the spacecraft completed perijove 3, with all but one instrument operating and returning data. One instrument, JIRAM, was off pending a flight software update. Perijove 4 occurred on February 2, 2017, with all instruments operating. Perijove 5 occurred on March 27, 2017. Perijove 6 took place on May 19, 2017.

Although the mission's lifetime is inherently limited by radiation exposure, almost all of this dose was planned to be acquired during the perijoves. , the 53.4 day orbit was planned to be maintained through July 2018 for a total of twelve science-gathering perijoves. At the end of this prime mission, the project was planned to go through a science review process by NASA's Planetary Science Division to determine if it will receive funding for an extended mission.

In June 2018, NASA extended the mission operations plan to July 2021. During the mission, the spacecraft will be exposed to high levels of radiation from Jupiter's magnetosphere, which may cause future failure of certain instruments and risk collision with Jupiter's moons.

In January 2021, NASA extended the mission operations to September 2025. In this phase Juno began to examine Jupiter's inner moons, Ganymede, Europa and Io. A flyby of Ganymede occurred on June 7, 2021, 17:35 UTC, coming within , the closest any spacecraft has come to the moon since Galileo in 2000. These flybys will further help with upcoming missions including NASA's Europa Clipper Mission and the European Space Agency's JUICE (JUpiter ICy moons Explorer), as well as the proposed Io Volcano Observer.

Planned deorbit and disintegration 
NASA originally planned to deorbit the spacecraft into the atmosphere of Jupiter after completing 32 orbits of Jupiter, but has since extended the mission to September 2025. The controlled deorbit is intended to eliminate space debris and risks of contamination in accordance with NASA's planetary protection guidelines.

Team 
Scott Bolton of the Southwest Research Institute in San Antonio, Texas is the principal investigator and is responsible for all aspects of the mission. The Jet Propulsion Laboratory in California manages the mission and the Lockheed Martin Corporation was responsible for the spacecraft development and construction. The mission is being carried out with the participation of several institutional partners. Coinvestigators include Toby Owen of the University of Hawaii, Andrew Ingersoll of California Institute of Technology, Frances Bagenal of the University of Colorado at Boulder, and Candy Hansen of the Planetary Science Institute. Jack Connerney of the Goddard Space Flight Center served as instrument lead.

Cost 
Juno was originally proposed at a cost of approximately US$700 million (fiscal year 2003) for a launch in June 2009 (equivalent to US$ million in ). NASA budgetary restrictions resulted in postponement until August 2011, and a launch on board an Atlas V rocket in the 551 configuration.  the mission was projected to cost US$1.46 billion for operations and data analysis through 2022.

Scientific objectives 

The Juno spacecraft's suite of science instruments will:
 Determine the ratio of oxygen to hydrogen, effectively measuring the abundance of water in Jupiter, which will help distinguish among prevailing theories linking Jupiter's formation to the Solar System.
 Obtain a better estimate of Jupiter's core mass, which will also help distinguish among prevailing theories linking Jupiter's formation to the Solar System.
 Precisely map Jupiter's gravitational field to assess the distribution of mass in Jupiter's interior, including properties of its structure and dynamics.
 Precisely map Jupiter's magnetic field to assess the origin and structure of the field, and the depth at which the planet's magnetic field is created. This experiment will also help scientists understand the fundamental physics of dynamo theory.
 Characterize and explore the three-dimensional structure of Jupiter's polar magnetosphere and auroras.
 Measure the orbital frame-dragging, known also as Lense–Thirring precession caused by the angular momentum of Jupiter, and possibly a new test of general relativity effects connected with the Jovian rotation.

Scientific instruments 
The Juno mission's scientific objectives will be achieved with a payload of nine instruments on board the spacecraft:

Microwave radiometer (MWR) 

The microwave radiometer comprises six antennas mounted on two of the sides of the body of the probe. They will perform measurements of electromagnetic waves on frequencies in the microwave range: 600 MHz, 1.2, 2.4, 4.8, 9.6 and 22 GHz, the only microwave frequencies which are able to pass through the thick Jovian atmosphere. The combination of different wavelengths and the emission angle should make it possible to obtain a temperature profile at various levels of the atmosphere. The data collected will determine how deep the atmospheric circulation is. The MWR is designed to function through orbit 11 of Jupiter.

Jovian Infrared Auroral Mapper (JIRAM) 

The spectrometer mapper JIRAM, operating in the near infrared (between 2 and 5 μm), conducts surveys in the upper layers of the atmosphere to a depth of between  where the pressure reaches . JIRAM will provide images of the aurora in the wavelength of 3.4 μm in regions with abundant H3+ ions. By measuring the heat radiated by the atmosphere of Jupiter, JIRAM can determine how clouds with water are flowing beneath the surface. It can also detect methane, water vapor, ammonia and phosphine. It was not required that this device meets the radiation resistance requirements. The JIRAM instrument is expected to operate through the eighth orbit of Jupiter.

Magnetometer (MAG) 

The magnetic field investigation has three goals: mapping of the magnetic field, determining the dynamics of Jupiter's interior, and determination of the three-dimensional structure of the polar magnetosphere. The magnetometer experiment consists of the Flux Gate Magnetometer (FGM), which will observe the strength and direction of the magnetic field lines, and the Advanced Stellar Compass (ASC), which will monitor the orientation of the magnetometer sensors.

Gravity Science (GS) 

The purpose of measuring gravity by radio waves is to establish a map of the distribution of mass inside Jupiter. The uneven distribution of mass in Jupiter induces small variations in gravity all along the orbit followed by the probe when it runs closer to the surface of the planet. These gravity variations drive small probe velocity changes. The purpose of radio science is to detect the Doppler effect on radio broadcasts issued by Juno toward Earth in Ka-band and X-band, which are frequency ranges that can conduct the study with fewer disruptions related to the solar wind or Jupiter's ionosphere.

Jovian Auroral Distributions Experiment (JADE) 

The energetic particle detector JADE will measure the angular distribution, energy, and the velocity vector of ions and electrons at low energy (ions between 13 eV and 20 KeV, electrons of 200 eV to 40 KeV) present in the aurora of Jupiter. On JADE, like JEDI, the electron analyzers are installed on three sides of the upper plate which allows a measure of frequency three times higher.

Jovian Energetic Particle Detector Instrument (JEDI) 

The energetic particle detector JEDI will measure the angular distribution and the velocity vector of ions and electrons at high energy (ions between 20 keV and 1 MeV, electrons from 40 to 500 keV) present in the polar magnetosphere of Jupiter. JEDI has three identical sensors dedicated to the study of particular ions of hydrogen, helium, oxygen and sulfur.

Radio and Plasma Wave Sensor (Waves) 

This instrument will identify the regions of auroral currents that define Jovian radio emissions and acceleration of the auroral particles by measuring the radio and plasma spectra in the auroral region. It will also observe the interactions between Jupiter's atmosphere and magnetosphere. The instrument consists of two antennae that detect radio and plasma waves.

Ultraviolet Spectrograph (UVS) 

UVS will record the wavelength, position and arrival time of detected ultraviolet photons during the time when the spectrograph slit views Jupiter during each turn of the spacecraft. The instrument will provide spectral images of the UV auroral emissions in the polar magnetosphere.

JunoCam (JCM) 

A visible light camera/telescope, included in the payload to facilitate education and public outreach; later re-purposed to study the dynamics of Jupiter's clouds, particularly those at the poles. It was anticipated that it would operate through only eight orbits of Jupiter ending in September 2017  due to the planet's damaging radiation and magnetic field, but as of November 2022 (46 orbits), JunoCam remains operational.

Operational components

Solar panels 

Juno is the first mission to Jupiter to use solar panels instead of the radioisotope thermoelectric generators (RTG) used by Pioneer 10, Pioneer 11, the Voyager program, Ulysses, Cassini–Huygens, New Horizons, and the Galileo orbiter. It is also the farthest solar-powered trip in the history of space exploration. Once in orbit around Jupiter, Juno receives only 4% as much sunlight as it would on Earth, but the global shortage of plutonium-238 at the time, as well as advances made in solar cell technology over the past several decades, makes it economically preferable to use solar panels of practical size to provide power at a distance of 5 a.u. from the Sun.

The Juno spacecraft uses three solar panels symmetrically arranged around the spacecraft. Shortly after it cleared Earth's atmosphere, the panels were deployed. Two of the panels have four hinged segments each, and the third panel has three segments and a magnetometer.

If the panels were optimized to operate at Earth, they would produce 12 to 14 kilowatts of power. Only about 486 watts were generated when Juno arrived at Jupiter, projected to decline to near 420 watts as radiation degrades the cells. The solar panels will remain in sunlight continuously from launch through the end of the mission, except for short periods during the operation of the main engine and eclipses by Jupiter. A central power distribution and drive unit monitors the power that is generated by the solar panels and distributes it to instruments, heaters, and experiment sensors, as well as to batteries that are charged when excess power is available. Two 55 Ah lithium-ion batteries that are able to withstand the radiation environment of Jupiter provide power when Juno passes through eclipse.

Telecommunications 

Juno uses in-band signaling ("tones") for several critical operations as well as status reporting during cruise mode, but it is expected to be used infrequently. The command and data processing of the Juno spacecraft includes a flight computer capable of providing about 50 Mbit/s of instrument throughput. Gravity science subsystems use the X-band and Ka-band Doppler tracking and autoranging.

Due to telecommunications constraints, Juno will only be able to return about 40 megabytes of JunoCam data during each 11-day orbital period, limiting the number of images that are captured and transmitted during each orbit to somewhere between 10 and 100 depending on the compression level used. The overall amount of data downlinked on each orbit is significantly higher and used for the mission's scientific instruments; JunoCam is intended for public outreach and is thus secondary to the science data. This is comparable to the previous Galileo mission that orbited Jupiter, which captured thousands of images despite its slow data rate of 1000 bit/s (at maximum compression level) due to the failure of its high gain antenna.

The communication system is also used as part of the Gravity Science experiment.

Propulsion 
Juno uses a LEROS 1b main engine with hypergolic propellant, manufactured by Moog Inc in Westcott, Buckinghamshire, England. It uses approx.  of hydrazine and nitrogen tetroxide for propulsion, including  available for the Jupiter Orbit Insertion plus subsequent orbital maneuvers. The engine provides a thrust of 645 newtons. The engine bell is enclosed in a debris shield fixed to the spacecraft body, and is used for major burns. For control of the vehicle's orientation (attitude control) and to perform trajectory correction maneuvers, Juno utilizes a monopropellant reaction control system (RCS) consisting of twelve small thrusters that are mounted on four engine modules.

Galileo plaque and minifigures 

 

Juno carries a plaque to Jupiter, dedicated to Galileo Galilei. The plaque was provided by the Italian Space Agency (ASI) and measures . It is made of flight-grade aluminum and weighs . The plaque depicts a portrait of Galileo and a text in Galileo's own handwriting, penned in January 1610, while observing what would later be known to be the Galilean moons. The text translates as:

The spacecraft also carries three Lego minifigures representing Galileo Galilei, the Roman god Jupiter, and his sister and wife, the goddess Juno. In Roman mythology, Jupiter drew a veil of clouds around himself to hide his mischief. Juno was able to peer through the clouds and reveal Jupiter's true nature. The Juno minifigure holds a magnifying glass as a sign of searching for the truth, and Jupiter holds a lightning bolt. The third Lego crew member, Galileo Galilei, has his telescope with him on the journey. The figurines were produced in partnership between NASA and Lego as part of an outreach program to inspire children's interest in science, technology, engineering, and mathematics (STEM). Although most Lego toys are made of plastic, Lego specially made these minifigures of aluminum to endure the extreme conditions of space flight.

Scientific results 
Among early results, Juno gathered information about Jovian lightning that revised earlier theories. Juno provided the first views of Jupiter's north pole, as well as providing insight about Jupiter's aurorae, magnetic field, and atmosphere.

In 2021, analysis of the frequency of interplanetary dust impacts (primarily on the backs of the solar panels), as Juno passed between Earth and the asteroid belt, indicated that this dust, which causes the Zodiacal light, comes from Mars, rather than from comets or asteroids that come from the outer solar system, as was previously thought.

Juno made many discoveries that are challenging existing theories about Jupiter's formation. When Juno flew over the poles of Jupiter it imaged clusters of stable cyclones that exist at the poles. It found that the magnetosphere of Jupiter is uneven and chaotic. Using its Microwave Radiometer Juno found that the red and white bands that can be seen on Jupiter extend hundreds of kilometers into the Jovian atmosphere, yet the interior of Jupiter isn't evenly mixed. This has resulted in the theory that Jupiter doesn't have a solid core as previously thought, but a "fuzzy" core made of pieces of rock and metallic hydrogen. This peculiar core may be a result of a collision that happened early on in Jupiter's formation.

Timeline

Gallery

Jupiter

Moons

See also 

 Atmosphere of Jupiter
 Comet Shoemaker–Levy 9
 Europa Clipper
 Exploration of Jupiter
 Jupiter Icy Moons Explorer
 List of missions to the outer planets
 Moons of Jupiter

References

External links 

 
 Juno mission at Southwest Research Institute
 Juno Mission at NASA's Solar System Exploration
 , Bill Nye discussing the science behind NASA's Juno mission to Jupiter
 JunoCam image processing web site
 Animation of perijove 15 flyby by Gerald Eichstädt (see channel for more)
 Animation of perijove 16 flyby by Gerald Eichstädt and Seán Doran (see albums 1, 2, 3, 4, 5, 6, 7, 8, 9, 10, 11, 12, 13, 14, 15, 16, 17, 18, 20 21, 23, 24 and 25 for more)
 Juno image album by Kevin M. Gill

 
NASA space probes
New Frontiers program
Lockheed Martin satellites and probes
Missions to Jupiter
Orbiters (space probe)
Space probes launched in 2011
2011 in the United States
Spacecraft launched by Atlas rockets
Articles containing video clips